Kunzea salterae, also known by the Maori name moutohora kanuka, is a flowering plant in the myrtle family, Myrtaceae and is endemic to Moutohora Island in New Zealand. It is a much-branched shrub or small spreading tree with needle-like leaves, sprays of white flowers and small cup-shaped or urn-shaped fruit.

Description

Taxonomy and naming
Kunzea salterae was first formally described in 2014 by Peter James de Lange and the description was published in PhytoKeys. The specific epithet (salterae) honours Josh Salter (born 1946) of Auckland.

Distribution and habitat
This kunzea grows in shrubland and regenerating forest on Moutohora Island.

Conservation status
Kunzea salterae is listed as "threatened - nationally vulnerable" under the New Zealand threat classification series 3.

References

salterae
Endemic flora of New Zealand
Plants described in 2014
Taxa named by Peter James de Lange